Journal Violone II is an album by bassist Barre Phillips recorded in 1979 and released on the ECM label.

Reception
Allmusic review awarded the album 3 stars.

Track listing
All compositions by Barre Phillips
 "Part I" - 7:10  
 "Part II" - 6:19  
 "Part III" - 5:02  
 "Part IV (To Aquirix Aida)" - 6:45  
 "Part V" - 3:26  
 "Part VI" - 11:03  
Recorded at Studio Bauer in Ludwigsburg, West Germany in June 1979

Personnel
Barre Phillips — bass
John Surman — soprano saxophone. baritone saxophone, bass clarinet, synthesizer
Aina Kemanis — voice

References

ECM Records albums
Barre Phillips albums
1980 albums
Albums produced by Manfred Eicher